Zielonki  is a village in southern Poland. It is located in the Lesser Poland Voivodeship and it is also the administrative center of the Gmina Zielonki.

References

Villages in Kraków County